Marven Gardens is a neighborhood in Margate City, Atlantic County, New Jersey, United States, located two miles (3 km) south of Atlantic City.

The name Marven Gardens is a portmanteau derived from Margate City and Ventnor City, because it lies on the border of Margate City and Ventnor City. Marven Gardens is surrounded by Ventnor Avenue, Winchester Avenue, Fredericksburg Avenue and Brunswick Avenue. The streets within it are Circle Drive, East Drive and West Drive, and signs at the end of each of these streets pay homage to its Monopoly heritage, with 'Marven Gardens' on a yellow background, and replicas of the house playing pieces adorn the posts on each sign. Most of the homes were built in the 1920s and 1930s.

Historic district

Marven Gardens Historic District is a  historic district encompassing the neighborhood. It was added to the National Register of Historic Places on September 13, 1990, for its significance in architecture, community planning and development. The district includes 105 contributing buildings.

Monopoly
Marven Gardens is famous as a yellow property on the original version of the Monopoly game board, although the game misspelled the name as Marvin Gardens. The misspelling was introduced by Charles and Olive Todd, who taught the game to Charles Darrow, its eventual patentee. His homemade Monopoly board was copied by Parker Brothers. In 1995, Parker Brothers acknowledged this mistake and formally apologized to the residents of Marven Gardens for the misspelling. It is the only property on the board that is not located within Atlantic City.

See also
The King of Marvin Gardens

References

External links 
 

Geography of Atlantic County, New Jersey
Historic districts on the National Register of Historic Places in New Jersey
Houses on the National Register of Historic Places in New Jersey
Margate City, New Jersey
Mission Revival architecture in New Jersey
National Register of Historic Places in Atlantic County, New Jersey
New Jersey Register of Historic Places
Neighborhoods in Greater Atlantic City, New Jersey
Tudor Revival architecture in New Jersey
Tourist attractions in Atlantic County, New Jersey
Houses in Atlantic County, New Jersey
Dutch Colonial Revival architecture in the United States